Cücük may refer to:

 Cücük, Agdash, a village and municipality in the Aghdash Rayon, Azerbaijan
 Cücük, Akyurt, a neighborhood of the district of Akyurt, Ankara Province, Turkey